Alfie is the sixth studio album by Alfie Boe. It was released on 31 October 2011 in the United Kingdom by Decca Records. The album peaked at number 6 on the UK Albums Chart.

Track listing

Chart performance

Weekly charts

Year-end charts

Certifications

Release history

References

2011 albums
Alfie Boe albums